Zamiast burzy is the third album from Pidżama Porno. It was a maxisingle released in 1994. It contains four tracks recorded in Studio CZAD in Swarzedz.

Track listing

Personnel

Krzysztof "Grabaż" Grabowski – vocal
Andrzej "Kozak" Kozakiewicz – guitar, vocal
Sławek "Dziadek" Mizerkiewicz – guitar, chords
Rafał "Kuzyn" Piotrowiak – drums
Jacek Kąkolewski – bass

Pidżama Porno albums
1994 EPs